Tris(trimethylsilyl)silane is the organosilicon compound with the formula (Me3Si)3SiH (where Me = CH3).  It is a colorless liquid that is classified as a hydrosilane since it contains an Si-H bond.  The compound is notable as having a weak Si-H bond, with a bond dissociation energy estimated at 84 kcal/mol.  For comparison, the Si-H bond in trimethylsilane is 94 kcal/mol.  With such a weak bond, the compound is used as a reagent to deliver hydrogen atoms.  The compound has been described as an environmentally benign analogue of tributyltin hydride.

The compound can be prepared by protonation of tris(trimethylsilyl)silyl lithium, which is derived from tetrakis(trimethylsilyl)silane:
(Me3Si)4Si  +  MeLi  →  (Me3Si)3SiLi  +  Me4Si
(Me3Si)3SiLi  +  HCl  →  (Me3Si)3SiH  +  LiCl

Alternatively, the reaction of trimethylsilyl chloride and trichlorosilane in the presence of lithium delivers the silane directly but in modest yield:
3 Me3SiCl  +  HSiCl3  +  6 Li  →  (Me3Si)3SiH +  6 LiCl

Many coordination complexes have been prepared with (Me3Si)3Si− (hypersilyl) ligand.  Chalcogenide derivatives of (Me3Si)3SiLi are also well developed:
3 Me3SiLi  +  E  →  (Me3Si)3SiELi (E = S, Se, Te)

References

Carbosilanes
Trimethylsilyl compounds